Guy Jonathan Porter (September 8, 1884 – February 22, 1951) was an American track and field athlete who competed in the 1904 Summer Olympics. In 1904 he did not finish in marathon competition.

References

External links
Guy Porter's profile at Sports Reference.com

1884 births
1951 deaths
American male marathon runners
Olympic track and field athletes of the United States
Athletes (track and field) at the 1904 Summer Olympics
20th-century American people